Ustazade Silvestre de Sacy (17 October 1801 – 14 February 1879) was a French journalist. He was born in Paris, the son of the linguist Antoine-Isaac Silvestre de Sacy (1758-1838), who in 1813, was created a baron by Napoleon. From 1828 to 1877, he was a literary and political contributor to the Journal des Débats. He became a curator at the Bibliothèque Mazarine in 1836 and became its administrator in 1848. He was elected to the Académie française on 18 May 1854, and became a senator in 1865.

References 

French literary critics
French librarians
1801 births
1879 deaths
Burials at Père Lachaise Cemetery
19th-century French journalists
French male journalists
French male writers
French people of Jewish descent
19th-century French male writers